CC4 may refer to:
 Cushioncraft CC4, the first car-sized hovercraft
Juan Orlando Hernández , current Honduran President (named by drug traffickers in files in the Southern District of New York)
 the French armored combat commands CC4 in Colmar Pocket
 the version 4 of Calculus Calculator, a numerical-analysis software
 the closed captioning channel CC4 in the Extended Data Services
 version 4 of the Creative Commons licenses
 Promenade MRT station, Singapore

CC-4 may refer to :
  would have been a Lexington-class battlecruiser, but was cancelled before completion